Gabriel Marie Jean Baptiste Legouvé (23 June 1764 – 30 August 1812) was an 18th–19th-century French poet and playwright.

Legouvé was born and died in Paris, and was the seventh member elected to occupy seat 4 of the Académie française in 1803.

Legouvé was the father of Ernest Legouvé (1807–1903), later a member of the Académie française, and son of Jean-Baptiste Legouvé (1729–1783) who wrote the pastoral La Mort d'Abel (1793) and a tragedy Epicharis et Nerón.

Works 
1784: Polyxène, tragedy
1786: La Mort des fils de Brutus, héroïde
1792: La mort d'Abel, three-act tragedy
1794: Épicharis et Néron, tragedy
1795: Quintus Fabius, tragedy
1798: Laurence, tragedy
1798: La Sépulture, elegy
1799: Étéocle et Polynice, tragedy
1799: Les Souvenirs d'une demoiselle sodomisée, elegy
1800: La Mélancolie, elegy
1801: Le Mérite des femmes, poem
1801: Christophe Morin
1806: La Mort d'Henri IV, tragedy
1813: Les souvenirs ou les avantages de la Mémoire

References

External links 
 Gabriel-Marie Legouvé on the site of the Académie française
 
 

1764 births
1812 deaths
Writers from Paris
Chevaliers of the Légion d'honneur
18th-century French poets
18th-century French male writers
19th-century French poets
18th-century French dramatists and playwrights
19th-century French dramatists and playwrights
Members of the Académie Française